Laurie Jean Hickox (December 6, 1945 – February 15, 1961) was an American pair skater who competed with her brother William Hickox. They won the bronze medal at the U.S. Championships, earning them the right to compete a month later at the World Championships in Prague.  They also finished sixth at the North American Figure Skating Championships that year.  They died along with their teammates on February 15, 1961, when Sabena Flight 548 crashed near Brussels, Belgium en route to the World Championships.  She was 15 years old.

Results
Pairs with Hickox

External links
 U.S. Figure Skating biography
 
 Shattered Dreams - Boston Globe Article Dec. 12, 2000
 In Memoriam: Laurie Jean Hickox and William Homes Hickox, Olla Podrida (Berkeley High School Yearbook) 1961

American female pair skaters
1961 deaths
Victims of aviation accidents or incidents in Belgium
1945 births
Victims of aviation accidents or incidents in 1961
20th-century American women
20th-century American people